The King County Library System (KCLS) is a library system serving the residents of King County, Washington, United States. Headquartered in Issaquah, Washington, KCLS was the busiest library system in the United States as of 2010, circulating 22.4 million items.  It consists of 50 libraries, a Traveling Library Center, a mobile TechLab, and the ABC Express children’s library van. KCLS offers a collection of more than 4.1 million items, including books, periodicals, newspapers, audio and videotapes, films, CDs, DVDs and extensive online resources. All KCLS libraries offer free Wi-Fi connections. People can check out 100 items and hold up to 50 items.

History
The library system began in 1942 when voters in King County established the King County Rural Library District in order to provide library services to people in "rural" areas with no easy access to city libraries. Funding for the library system is provided from property taxes. Funding measures for the system passed in 1966, 1977, 1980, 1988, 2002, 2004, and 2010. Property taxes account for 94% of revenue today. The KCLS budget for 2017 was $120 million. The name of the organization was changed from the King County Rural Library District to the present-day King County Library System in 1978, 
although the previous name of "Rural Library District" is still part of the organization's legal name.

KCLS extends access privileges to residents of its service area, which includes all unincorporated areas of King County as well as residents of every city in the county except Hunts Point, and Yarrow Point. Residents of Seattle – which maintains its own library system – are allowed access to KCLS collections under reciprocal borrowing agreements between KCLS and Seattle's libraries. KCLS also extends reciprocal borrowing privileges to residents of many other library systems in Western and North Central Washington. The cities of Hunts Point and Yarrow Point do not have library service at all.

Under a $172 million capital bond passed in 2004, the King County Library system is rebuilding, renovating, and expanding most of its existing libraries, as well as building new libraries.

KCLS has annexed the city of Renton's public library system, the result of a vote by the city's residents in February 2010.  This library system includes a  library branch built completely over the Cedar River.

In 2011, KCLS won the Gale/Library Journal "Library of the Year" award.

Facilities
KCLS consists of 50 branches, Traveling Library Center, ABC Express Vans, mobile TechLab, and a service center located in Issaquah that houses the library's administrative offices. A program to build 17 new libraries and renovate or expand 26 other libraries was completed in 2019 with the opening of the Panther Lake Library in Kent.

Branches

Algona-Pacific Library
Auburn Library
Bellevue Regional Library (largest)
Black Diamond Library
Bothell Regional Library
Boulevard Park Library
Burien Library
Carnation Library
Covington Library
Des Moines Library
Duvall Library
Fairwood Library
Enumclaw Library
Fall City Library
Federal Way Regional Library
Federal Way 320th Library
Greenbridge Library (White Center)
Issaquah Library
Kenmore Library
Kent Regional Library
Kent Panther Lake Library
Kingsgate Library (Kirkland)
Kirkland Library
Lake Forest Park Library
Lake Hills Library (Bellevue)
Library Connection at Crossroads (Bellevue)
Library Connection at Southcenter (Tukwila)
Library Express at Redmond Ridge (Redmond)
Maple Valley Library
Mercer Island Library
Muckleshoot Library (Auburn)
Newcastle Library 
Newport Way Library (Bellevue)
North Bend Library
Redmond Regional Library
Renton Library
Renton Highlands Library
Richmond Beach Library (Shoreline)
Sammamish Library
Shoreline Library
Skykomish Library
Skyway Library
Snoqualmie Library
Tukwila Library
Valley View Library (SeaTac)
Vashon Library
White Center Library
Woodinville Library
Woodmont Library (Des Moines)

Mobile services

References

External links
 

County library systems in Washington (state)
Education in King County, Washington
Government agencies established in 1942
Organizations based in Issaquah, Washington
1942 establishments in Washington (state)